Farid Ghazi (born 16 March 1974 in Guelma, Algeria) is an Algerian former professional footballer who played as a forward. He made 22 appearances for the Algeria national team scoring five goals.

Honours
Troyes
 UEFA Intertoto Cup: 2001

HJK Helsinki
 Finnish Cup: 2006

JSM Béjaïa
 Algerian Cup: 2008

Individual
 Topscorer of the Algerian League with JS Kabylie in 1998-99 season with 19 goals
 Ilta-Sanomat Player of the Year Award 2006

References

External links

Farid Ghazi at DZFoot.com

1974 births
Living people
Algerian footballers
Association football forwards
Algeria international footballers
ES Troyes AC players
JS Kabylie players
Algerian Ligue Professionnelle 1 players
Ligue 1 players
Veikkausliiga players
Helsingin Jalkapalloklubi players
JSM Béjaïa players
People from Guelma
US Chaouia players
2000 African Cup of Nations players
2002 African Cup of Nations players
ES Guelma players
Olympique Béja players
21st-century Algerian people
Algerian expatriate footballers
Algerian expatriate sportspeople in France
Expatriate footballers in France
Algerian expatriate sportspeople in Finland
Expatriate footballers in Finland
Algerian expatriate sportspeople in the United Arab Emirates
Expatriate footballers in the United Arab Emirates
Algerian expatriate sportspeople in Tunisia
Expatriate footballers in Tunisia